This is a list of ratings for Swedish television in 2006. The share of the viewing for the five largest channels is listed, along with the five most watched programmes every week. Swedish television ratings are monitored by Nielsen Media Research for Mediamätning i Skandinavien using a panel of around 2600 individuals.

Television in Sweden
Rat